Nicholas John Scouler Buchanan (born 11 June 1989) is an English cricketer and schoolteacher. Buchanan is a right-handed batsman who bowls right-arm fast-medium.  He was born at Basingstoke, Hampshire. He is now a  teacher of history and politics at Dr Challoner's Grammar School, in Amersham, Buckinghamshire.

While studying for a degree in History at Hertford College, Oxford, Buchanan made a single first-class appearance for Oxford University against Cambridge University in the 2009 University Match at Fenner's.  In this match, he was dismissed for 7 runs by Ruel Brathwaite in Oxford's first-innings total of 152, while in Cambridge's first-innings he took the wicket of Ananya Sen to finish with figures of 1/30 from ten overs, with Cambridge being dismissed for 339.  He ended Oxford's second-innings of 226 not out on 1, while in Cambridge's second-innings he bowled just the one over as Cambridge won the match by 10 wickets.

After joining the staff of Dr Challoner's Grammar School in 2013, as a history teacher Nick Buchanan. Following the departure of Patrick Buckland on the 18th December 2020, Buchanan was appointed the head of the History and Politics Department.

References

External links
Nick Buchanan at ESPNcricinfo
Nick Buchanan at CricketArchive

1989 births
Living people
Alumni of Hertford College, Oxford
Cricketers from Basingstoke
English cricketers
Oxford University cricketers